Cool Blues is a live album by American jazz organist Jimmy Smith featuring performances recorded at Small's Paradise in New York City in 1958 but not released on the Blue Note label until 1980. The album was rereleased on CD with three bonus tracks recorded at the same performance.

Reception
The Allmusic review by Scott Yanow awarded the album 4 stars stating

Track listing
 "Dark Eyes" (Traditional) – 11:43
 "Groovin' at Small's" (Babs Gonzales) – 12:01
 Announcements by Babs Gonzales – 0:26 Bonus track on CD reissue
 "A Night in Tunisia" (Dizzy Gillespie) – 17:04
 "Cool Blues" (Charlie Parker) – 11:07
 "What's New?" (Bob Haggart, Johnny Burke) – 6:18 Bonus track on CD reissue
 "Small's Minor" (Jimmy Smith) – 6:44 Bonus track on CD reissue
 "Once in a While" (Michael Edwards, Bud Green) – 6:46 Bonus track on CD reissue
 Recorded at Small's Paradise in New York City on April 7, 1958

Personnel

Musicians
 Jimmy Smith – organ
 Lou Donaldson – alto saxophone (tracks 1–6,8)
 Tina Brooks – tenor saxophone (tracks 1–5)
 Eddie McFadden – guitar
 Art Blakey – drums, (tracks 1–4)
 Donald Bailey – drums, (tracks 5–8)

Technical
 Alfred Lion – producer
 Rudy Van Gelder – engineer
 Bill Burks – design
 Mark Lipson – photography
 Michael Cuscuna – liner notes

References

Blue Note Records live albums
Jimmy Smith (musician) live albums
1978 live albums
Albums produced by Alfred Lion
Live soul jazz albums